Megalopus is a genus of beetles in the family Megalopodidae, containing the following species:

 Subgenus Falsomegalopus Pic, 1916
 Megalopus apicalis Pic, 1916
 Megalopus diformipes Pic, 1916
 Megalopus guyanensis Pic, 1916
 Megalopus incisus Pic, 1916
 Megalopus parallelus Lacordaire, 1845
 Subgenus Megalopus Fabricius, 1801
 Megalopus analis Klug, 1824
 Megalopus angustatus Lacordaire, 1845
 Megalopus annulipes Pic, 1916
 Megalopus basalis Jacoby, 1892
 Megalopus brasiliensis Jacoby, 1903
 Megalopus brevipennis Jacoby, 1903
 Megalopus calcaratus Lacordaire, 1845
 Megalopus cruralis Klug, 1824
 Megalopus dentipes Bates, 1866
 Megalopus elongatus Baly, 1876
 Megalopus femoratus Serville, 1825
 Megalopus flavofasciatus Clark, 1866
 Megalopus foveifrons Pic, 1948
 Megalopus hirtipes Klug, 1824
 Megalopus impictus Bates, 1866
 Megalopus inscriptus Klug, 1824
 Megalopus lituratus Klug, 1834
 Megalopus luteosignatus Pic, 1940
 Megalopus melipona Clark, 1866
 Megalopus nigricornis Fabricius, 1801
 Megalopus nigrovittatus Jacoby, 1873
 Megalopus poecilosomus Lacordaire, 1845
 Megalopus ruficornis Fabricius, 1801
 Megalopus seriatus Lacordaire, 1845
 Megalopus sexvittatus Bates, 1866
 Megalopus szantoi Papp, 1951
 Megalopus tabidus Klug, 1834
 Megalopus thoracicus Jacoby, 1903
 Megalopus tuberculatus Klug, 1834
 Megalopus unifasciatus Pic, 1916
 Megalopus violaceofasciatus Jacoby, 1888
 Megalopus vittaticollis Baly, 1876
 Megalopus waterhousei Baly, 1859
 Subgenus Mucromegalopus Pic, 1916
 Megalopus armatus Lacordaire, 1845
 Megalopus atripennis Pic, 1916
 Megalopus boliviensis Pic, 1954
 Megalopus buckleyi Jacoby, 1889
 Megalopus jacobyi Bruch, 1908
 Megalopus monstrosicornis Pic, 1916
 Megalopus schaeferi Monrós, 1947
 Megalopus vespa Monrós, 1947

References

Megalopodidae genera
Taxa named by Johan Christian Fabricius